Nutwood is an unincorporated community in Jersey County, Illinois, United States. It is located along Illinois Route 100, about four miles west-southwest of Fieldon.

References

Unincorporated communities in Illinois
Unincorporated communities in Jersey County, Illinois